Jiluwi bin Abdulaziz Al Saud (born 1958) is a member of the Jiluwi cadet branch of the Saudi royal family, House of Saud. The Jiluwis are the descendant of Jiluwi bin Turki who was younger brother of King Abdulaziz's grandfather and the second ruler of the Emirate of Najd, Faisal bin Turki. He is a former military personnel and has been serving as the governor of Najran Province since November 2014.

Biography
Prince Jiluwi was born in Hail in 1958. His father, Abdulaziz bin Musaed, was the governor of Hail Province and the full brother of Al Jawhara bint Musaed, mother of Prince Mohammed and King Khalid.

He is a graduate of the School of Paratroopers and Special Forces Security Center and held a diploma from the British Parachute Association. He involved in the Operation Desert Storm. Following his retirement from the Saudi military forces he was appointed the deputy governor of Tabuk Province which he held between April 2000 and July 2004. His next post was the deputy governor of the Eastern Province from July 2004 to November 2014.

Jiluwi bin Abdulaziz was named the governor of Najran Province with the rank of minister in November 2014. He replaced Mishaal bin Abdullah in the post.

References

External links

Jiluwi
1958 births
Jiluwi
Living people
Saudi Arabian military personnel
Saudi Arabian princes